Guts & Garbage is the debut full-length album by Kirsten Price, released on October 19, 2007.  The album's single, "Magic Tree", was featured on Showtime's The L Word, and appeared on a compilation CD for that show.

Track listing
 "Magic Tree" – 3:24
 "All Right" – 3:21
 "Fall”– 3:10
 "Crazy Beautiful" – 3:40
 "5 Days Old" – 4:20
 "Freedom" – 3:28
 "Bring Me Back" – 3:27
 "Let Me Go" – 4:07
 "Red Hot" – 4:05
 "Possibilities" – 4:31

References

2007 debut albums